Velli Thirai is a 2008 Indian Tamil-language satirical drama film directed by debutant Viji, the dialogue writer for Radha Mohan's films, and produced by Prakash Raj. It is a remake of the 2005 Malayalam film Udayananu Tharam. The film stars Prithviraj and Gopika, along with Prakash Raj in a prominent role.

Principal photography took place in locations in India, Indonesia, and Australia. The film score and soundtrack were composed by G. V. Prakash Kumar, with many songs altered from the original. The film released on 7 March 2008. The movie failed to do well at the box office.

Plot
Saravanan, a struggling assistant director, goes to Hyderabad in hopes of pursuing his dream. His roommate, Kanniah copies his script and gives it to a producer. Kanniah tells the producer that he wants to star in the film himself. The producer agrees to the condition after seeing the script. Kanniah becomes famous due to the film and is rechristened Dilipkanth (inspired by the name Rajinikanth). Saravanan does not give up and creates another story. However, he finds out that he cannot make his film unless Dileep plays the hero. Because of this, they lead into minor problems, which annoy Saravanan and their team. The shooting starts with Dileep as the hero but is halted midway, owing to various tantrums thrown by the new opportunistic hero. Determined to finish the movie, Saravanan seeks the help of his crew and friends in the cinema industry. Unknown to Dileep, Saravanan and his crew manipulate him into situations that match the storyline of the movie they are shooting for and capture Dileep's live reactions. They manage to fool Dileep and finish shooting the climax of the film even as the self-claimed new star makes a fool of himself. A few days later, he is invited to watch the premiere of the movie and is shocked to see the recent events of his life unfold on the silver screen. He soon realizes the effort put in by Saravanan and the crew and feels humbled. He genuinely acknowledges the talent of the director and leaves the place, apologizing to Saravanan for his pathetic behavior and agreeing that Saravanan is better than him in a very mannered way.

Cast

Production
After the success of Mozhi (2007), Moser Baer, who released the DVD of Mozhi under their company, collaborated with Duet Movies and launched three projects on 2007 with Vellithirai being one of them. The film was launched under the title of Kallapart. Trisha was to be in the film, but she backed out due to call sheet problems. Asin expressed interest in starring in the film.

Soundtrack

The soundtrack consisted of five songs composed by G. V. Prakash.

Reception
Behindwoods wrote "A witty satire of the perils of stardom in Indian cinema. Though Vellithirai, the Tamil remake of Malayalam’s Udayananu Tharam, lacks the original’s brilliant touches, it is still entertaining to an extent". Rediff wrote "Watch Vellithirai for some good old cat-and-mouse games in the movie industry with well-timed punches. The magic of the silver screen rarely disappoints". Sify wrote "On the whole Vellithira is not a faithful remake and therein lies its pitfalls, but at the same time it is a breezy fun movie".

References

External links
Vellithirai review at Thiraipadam

2008 films
Films about filmmaking
Films scored by G. V. Prakash Kumar
Tamil remakes of Malayalam films
Indian satirical films
2000s Tamil-language films